Cremilda Santana dos Santos (Ilhéus, May 15, 1946) is a Brazilian actress and comedian.

Career 
She became known between 2015 and 2017 for participating in the boards of the program Pânico na Band as ''As Gagas de Ilhéus'', ''Desempregagas'''' and ''Largagas e Peladas''.''

Cremilda is the older sister of actress and humorist Solange Damasceno.

Filmography

Television

References 

1946 births
Brazilian television actresses
Brazilian humorists
Living people
21st-century Brazilian actresses
People from Ilhéus

External links